Candela Belén Francisco Guecamburu (born 14 August 2006) is an Argentinian chess player who holds the title of Woman FIDE Master (WFM). She has been Argentinian girls' youth champion in the under-12 division in 2017, the under-14 division in 2019, and the under-16 division in 2021. She was runner-up to María Florencia Fernández in the Argentine Women's Chess Championship in 2022. 

Francisco was a participant in youth chess training camp hosted at the 2021 World Chess Championship that featured coaching from high-level players including former World Champion Viswanathan Anand. Francisco began playing chess at age six after her parents bought her a chess set for Christmas. She started training in Pilar where she is from at age nine, but later received training at the Círculo de Ajedrez de Villa Martelli, a much higher-level chess club in Vicente López Partido closer to the center of Buenos Aires about 50 kilometres from where her family lived.

References

2006 births
Living people
Argentine female chess players
Sportspeople from Buenos Aires